Paul Bilokapic (born 8 August 1976) is an Australian former footballer who played as a midfielder.

Playing career

Club career
After playing youth football for Yaralla, he moved to Sydney Croatia (later Sydney United) where he played until the end of the 1997–98 National Soccer League season. After two seasons with Northern Spirit FC, he returned to Sydney United, where he played until the end of the 2002–03 National Soccer League season.

International career
Bilokapic made his full international debut for Australia in February 1998 in a friendly match against Chile.  He made two appearances for Australia, both in 1998.

Personal life
He is the uncle of Nicholas Bilokapic who plays as a goalkeeper for English club Huddersfield Town.

References

External links

1976 births
Australian soccer players
Australia international soccer players
Australian people of Croatian descent
Northern Spirit FC players
Sydney United 58 FC players
Living people
Association football midfielders
Wollongong United FC players